The second season of the animated series WordGirl aired between November 4, 2008 and July 20, 2010 on PBS in the United States. The second season contained 26 episodes.

Cast
 Dannah Phirman: Becky Botsford/Wordgirl, Claire McCallister, Chuck's Mom, Edith Von Hoosinghaus, Pretty Princess.
 Chris Parnell: Narrator, Henchmen #1, Museum Security Guard, Exposition Guy.
 James Adomian: Bob/Captain Huggy Face, David Driscoll, Raul Demiglasse, Hunter Throbheart, Harry Kempel, Chip Von Dumor.
 Jack D. Ferraiolo: The Butcher.
 Fred Stoller: Chuck the Evil Sandwich Making Guy.
 Cree Summer: Granny May.
 Patton Oswalt: Theodore “Tobey” McCallister the Third, Robots.
 Tom Kenny: Dr. Two-Brains, TJ Botsford, Warden Chalmers, Steve McClean.
 Jeffrey Tambor: Mr. Big.
 John C. McGinley: The Whammer.
 Maria Bamford: Violet Heaslip, Sally Botsford, Leslie.
 Grey DeLisle: Lady Redundant Woman, Ms. Question, Mrs. Ripley.
 Pamela Adlon: Eileen aka The Birthday Girl.
 Ryan Raddatz: Todd “Scoops” Ming, Tim Botsford.
 Larry Murphy: The Amazing Rope Guy, Reporter Stu Brisket, Gold Store Dealer, School Principal, Movie Theater Manager, Security Guard for Movie Theater, Joe the Guard, Used Car Salesman.
 Jen Cohn: Rich Old Lady, Female Bank Teller, Ms. Champlain.
 Daran Norris: Seymour Orlando Smooth, Nocan the Contrarian.
 Ron Lynch: The Mayor.
 H. Jon Benjamin: Reginald the Jewelry Store Clerk, Invisi-Bill.
 Jim Gaffigan: Mr. Dudley.
 Mike O’Connell: Grocery Store Manager, Big Left Hand Guy.

Episodes 

{| class="wikitable plainrowheaders" style="width:100%; margin:auto; background:#FFFFFF;"
|-
!! style="background-color: Pink; color:#000; text-align: center;" width=20|No. inseries
!! style="background-color: Pink; color:#000; text-align: center;" width=20|No. inseason
!! style="background-color: Pink; color:#000; text-align: center;"|Title
!! style="background-color: Pink; color:#000; text-align: center;"|Written by
!! style="background-color: Pink; color:#000; text-align: center;" width=30|Original airdate
!! style="background-color: Pink; color:#000; text-align: center;" width=20|Prod. code

|}

References

2008 American television seasons
2009 American television seasons
2010 American television seasons
WordGirl seasons